Claudia Dasca Romeu (born 4 November 1994 in Sabadell), also known as Claudia Dasca, is a Spanish swimmer who competes in the Women's 400m individual medley. At the 2012 Summer Olympics she finished 25th overall in the heats in the Women's 400 metre individual medley and failed to reach the final.

Notes

References

External links
 

1994 births
Living people
Spanish female freestyle swimmers
Spanish female medley swimmers
Olympic swimmers of Spain
Swimmers at the 2010 Summer Youth Olympics
Swimmers at the 2012 Summer Olympics
Mediterranean Games silver medalists for Spain
Mediterranean Games bronze medalists for Spain
Mediterranean Games medalists in swimming
Swimmers at the 2013 Mediterranean Games